UWE-2 (University Würzburg's Experimental satellite 2) was a follow-on picosatellite technology demonstration project within the CubeSat family standard, developed and built by students of the University of Würzburg, Germany. The overall objective is to demonstrate the capabilities of attitude determination and control in picosatellites.

Mission 

Developed by the University of Würzburg, its scientific objectives are:
 tests of methods and algorithms for attitude determination
 optimisation of internet protocol parameters, in order to adapt to the specific space environment.

Launch 
On 23 September 2009, at 06:21 UTC, UWE-2 was launched by a Polar Satellite Launch Vehicle (PSLV) launch vehicle (PSLV-C14) together with Oceansat-2 and three further CubeSats in a polar orbit at 720 km altitude. Successful operations could be initiated. Use of SPL (Single Picosatellite Launcher) of Astro und Feinwerktechnik Adlershof GmbH (Berlin), Germany, for the deployment of the CubeSats.

UWE-2 followed the earlier UWE-1. UWE-3 is also planned.

See also 

 List of CubeSats

References

External links 
 UWE-2 homepage
 Uni-Satellit UWE-2 erfolgreich gestartet, Gunnar Bartsch, Stabsstelle Öffentlichkeitsarbeit, Julius-Maximilians-Universität Würzburg, 23 September 2009
 information on UWE-3

Satellites orbiting Earth
Spacecraft launched in 2009
CubeSats
Satellites of Germany